Managerial hubris is the unrealistic belief held by managers in bidding firms that they can manage the assets of a target firm more efficiently than the target firm's current management. 

Managerial hubris is one reason a manager may choose to invest in a merger that on average generates no profits.

See also
Leveraged buyout

References 

Management
Mergers and acquisitions